Christophe Grégoire (born 20 April 1980) is a Belgian former professional football player and manager, most recently in charge of Virton.

Coaching career
After playing for RFCB Sprimont from 2011 to 2014, he retired and became the manager of the club. He was in charge until November 2016, where he was appointed manager of RFC Seraing. After a streak without any victories, Grégoire was fired on 8 December 2019.

References

External links
 Profile at VI.nl 
 

1980 births
Living people
Footballers from Liège
Walloon sportspeople
Association football midfielders
Belgian footballers
Belgian football managers
Belgium international footballers
Belgium under-21 international footballers
RFC Liège players
Royal Excel Mouscron players
R.S.C. Anderlecht players
K.A.A. Gent players
Willem II (football club) players
R. Charleroi S.C. players
Belgian Pro League players
Eredivisie players
Belgian expatriate footballers
Expatriate footballers in the Netherlands
Belgian expatriate sportspeople in the Netherlands
Belgian First Division B managers
R.E. Virton managers